The Okinoerabu dialect cluster ( Shimamuni), also Oki-no-Erabu, is a dialect cluster spoken on Okinoerabu Island, Kagoshima Prefecture of southwestern Japan. It is part of the Amami–Okinawan languages, which are part of the Japonic languages.

Dialects

Okinoerabu dialects are classified into two groups:
Eastern Okinoerabu
Western Okinoerabu
The linguistic boundary between Eastern and Western Okinoerabu roughly corresponds to the administrative boundary between Wadomari (east) and China (west). In addition, the eastern community of Kunigami (part of Eastern Okinoerabu and not to be confused with Northern Okinawa) is known for sporadically retaining a centralized vowel, which is a characteristic of Northern Amami. The northwestern community of Tamina (part of Western Okinoerabu) has a distinctive accentual system.

Folk terminology
Takahashi Takayo (b. 1967), a cultural anthropologist from the island, stated that the language of each community or the island as a whole was called shimamuni. Each language variety within the island had distinctive characteristics. The language of the community of Kunigami on the island, for example, was referred to as Kunigami-bushi. It retained mutually intelligibility with the languages of the island's other communities. It is said that Okinoerabu was mutually unintelligible with neighboring Yoron and Tokunoshima.

Phonology

Eastern Okinoerabu
The following is the phonology of the Wadomari dialect (part of Eastern Okinoerabu), which is based on Hirayama et al. (1986).

As with most Ryukyuan languages to the north of Central Okinawan, stops are described as "plain" C’ and "glottalized" C‘. Phonetically, the two series are lightly aspirated  and tenuis , respectively.

Consonants

Notes
The zero onset /'/ may be added.
 is new and infrequent.

Vowels

Correspondences to Standard Japanese
Only major sound correspondences are listed.
Standard Japanese  is merged into .
Standard Japanese  is merged into .
 and  palatalized before .
The fusion of consecutive morae resulted in the glottalized and 'tense' consonants in Eastern Okinoerabu.

Western Okinoerabu
The following is the phonology of the China dialect (part of Western Okinoerabu), which is based on Hirayama et al. (1986).

Consonants

Notes
The zero onset /'/ may be added.
 is new and infrequent.

Vowels

Differences between Eastern and Western Okinoerabu
Similarly, Western Okinoerabu  has not undergone palatalization.

References

Further reading
Sakimura Hirofumi, 1987. A New View on the Accentual Systems of the Japanese Dialects in Okino-erabujima (in Japanese).

External links
Database of Shimamuni  (in Japanese)
 Videos in Kunigami dialect
 
 
 
 
 
 
 

Kagoshima Prefecture
Ryukyuan languages